Anterior cutaneous branch may refer to:

 Anterior cutaneous branches of the femoral nerve
 Anterior cutaneous branch of the iliohypogastric nerve